Johannes Ludgerus Bonaventure Brenninkmeijer (born 19 July 1930 in Amsterdam – 2 July 2003) was a Dutch clergyman and bishop for the Roman Catholic Diocese of Kroonstad. He became ordained in 1957. He was appointed bishop in 1977. He died on 2 July 2003 in Kroonstad, at the age of 72.

References

20th-century Dutch Roman Catholic priests
1930 births
2003 deaths
Clergy from Amsterdam
20th-century Roman Catholic bishops in South Africa
21st-century Roman Catholic bishops in South Africa
Dutch expatriates in South Africa
Roman Catholic bishops of Kroonstad